Karoon may refer to:

 Kārūn, a river in Iran
 Korah or Qārūn, Biblical figure who led a rebellion against Moses